Jo Seok-Hwan (born October 15, 1979) is a retired South Korean amateur boxer.
He participated in the 2000 Summer Olympics for his native East Asian country. There he was stopped in the first round of the Bantamweight (54 kg) division by Uzbekistan' Alisher Rahimov.
Later Jo won the bronze medal in the Featherweight (57 kg) division at the 2003 World Amateur Boxing Championships in Bangkok.

He participated in the 2004 Summer Olympics, and won the bronze medal. He qualified for the Athens Games by winning the silver medal at the 2004 Asian Amateur Boxing Championships in Puerto Princesa, Philippines. In the final he was defeated by Kazakhstan's Galib Jafarov.

In December 2008, Jo retired from boxing. He is currently serving as an assistant coach of the South Korea national boxing team.

Results

References
 
 

1979 births
Living people
Olympic boxers of South Korea
Boxers at the 2000 Summer Olympics
Boxers at the 2004 Summer Olympics
Olympic bronze medalists for South Korea
Olympic medalists in boxing
Boxers at the 2006 Asian Games
South Korean male boxers
AIBA World Boxing Championships medalists
Medalists at the 2004 Summer Olympics
Asian Games competitors for South Korea
Featherweight boxers